Srikakulam district is one of the twenty-six districts of the Indian state of Andhra Pradesh, located in the Uttarandhra region of the state, with its headquarters located at Srikakulam. It is one of the six districts, located in the extreme northeastern direction of the state. It was formerly known as Chicacole , and was under Ganjam district till 1936 April 1, then merged under Vizagapatam district .This was once the part of ancient Kalinga.

History

Prehistory 
Evidence of early historic man and his activities during the Stone Age and Iron Age have been discovered at Sangamayya Konda and Dannanapeta. The speciality of Dannanapeta Iron Age megalithic site is a large single capstone as a dolmen with 36 ft in length and 14 ft in width and 2 ft thickness. Sailada Hills consists of 36 upright rocks and natural caves used for habitation by Iron Age man in Amudalavalasa mandal of the district.

Jainism and Buddhism 

Evidences of Jain monuments and Buddhist remnants were discovered near Sangamayya Konda. Jain rock beds were discovered at Dannanapeta near Amudalavalasa in the district. Salihundam is a famous Buddhist remnants site on the south bank of River Vamsadhara 5 kilometres west of Kalingapatnam and 18 kilometres from Srikakulam town.

Post Independence 
Srikakulam District was carved out in 1950 by bifurcating it from Visakhapatnam District. It remained unaffected in its territorial jurisdiction for some time. But in November 1969 the district lost 63 villages from Saluru Taluk and 44 villages from Bobbili Taluk on account of their transfer to the then newly constituted Gajapathinagaram Taluk of Visakhapatnam District.

In May 1979, the district underwent major territorial changes with the formation of a new district with headquarters at Vizianagaram which involved transfer of Salur, Bobbili, Parvathipuram and Cheepurupalli Taluks to the new district. Srikakulam's culture is a blend of traditional festivals, food, music and theatres.

Geography 
It is within the geographic coordinates of 18°-20’ and 19°-10’ N and 83°-50’ and 84°-50’ E. The district is skirted to a distance by Kandivalasagedda, Vamsadhara and Bahuda at certain stretches of their courses while a line of heights of the great Eastern Ghats run from the northeast. Vizianagaram district and Parvathipuram Manyam district flanks in the south and west while Odisha bounds it on the north and Bay of Bengal on the East. Srikakulam district can be divided into two main distinct natural divisions. A portion of Srikakulam district is plain terrain with intense agriculture and the other is rocky and hilly terrain covered with forests. Some of the Mahendragiri Hills covers Srikakulam district. Most of the forest area of the plain terrain has been damaged by intense agriculture. Kotthuru, Hiramandalam, Pathapatnam, Kalingadal reservoir and some other areas are still covered with dense forests. It has a population of 2,703,114 of which 10.98% is urban as of 2001. Srikakulam district has the longest coastline (about ) in the state of Andhra Pradesh.

Major rivers flowing through the district are River Nagavali, River Vamsadhara, Mahendratanaya, Champavati, Bahuda, Kumbhikota Gedda, Suvarnamukhi, Vegavati, Gomukhi. The Nagavali and Vamsadhara are the major rivers in Srikakulam district. These two river basins together constitute about 5% of the area. The Mahendratanaya and Bahuda rivers are two minor river basins in the district. Others are Benjigedda, Peddagedda, Kandivalasa gedda.

Demographics 

According to the 2011 census Srikakulam district has a population of 2,703,114, roughly equal to the nation of Kuwait or the US state of Nevada. This gives it a ranking of 147th in India (out of a total of 640). Its population growth rate over the decade 2001–2011 was 6.38%. Srikakulam has a sex ratio of 1014 females for every 1000 males, and a literacy rate of 62.3%.

After reorganization the district had a population of 21,91,437, with a sex ratio of 1014 females to every 100 males. 373,746 (17.05%) lives in urban areas. Scheduled Castes and Scheduled Tribes made up 1,85,890 (8.48%) and 94,371 (4.31%) of the population respectively.

At the time of the 2011 census, 92.34% of the population spoke Telugu, 6.18% Odia and 0.92% Sora as their first language.

Household indicators 
According to 2007–08, International Institute for Population Sciences, 86.9% had access to electricity, 70.4% had drinking water, 18.5% toilet facilities, and 47.2% lived in a pucca (permanent) home. 31.5% of girls wed before the legal age of 18 and 90.1% of interviewees carried a BPL card.

Cities And Towns

Administrative Divisions 
The district has three revenue divisions — Srikakulam, Palasa and Tekkali. They are divided into 30 mandals in the district. The district has 12 towns and 973 villages. There are one municipal corporation, three municipalities, two nagar panchayats and seven census towns. The municipal corporation in the district is Srikakulam and three municipalities in the district are Amadalavalasa, Ichchapuram, Palasa-Kasibugga. The six census towns are Balaga, Hiramandalam, Narasannapeta, Ponduru, Sompeta, Tekkali.

Mandals 

The 30 mandals in Srikakulam district under three revenue divisions are listed in the following table:

Politics

Srikakulam (Lok Sabha constituency), Vizianagaram (Lok Sabha constituency)

The seven Assembly segments of Srikakulam Lok Sabha and One Assembly segment of Vijayanagaram Lok Sabha constituency are:

Erstwhile Talukas 
Before Formation of Mandals, Administration was done through Taluka system. Erstwhile Talukas in district is given below.

In 1978, the number of talukas in Srikakulam district was increased from 14 to 19. Later in 1985, 19 Talukas were divided into 60 mandals, out of which 14 talukas were in Srikakulam further bifurcated into 38 Mandals.

Parliamentary and Assembly constituencies 

There are three Parliamentary Constituencies and 10 assembly constituencies in Srikakulam district. Parliamentary constituencies include Srikakulam, Araku, and Vizianagaram.

The 10 Assembly Constituencies are Amadalavalasa, Rajam, Tekkali, Ichchapuram, Palasa, Narasannapeta, Palakonda, Pathapatnam, Srikakulam and Etcherla.

Municipalities in District

Economy 

The primary, secondary and tertiary sectors of the district contribute ,  and  respectively.

Tribal communities such as the Saora and Jatapus still practise the traditional podu system of cultivation.

Dr. Reddy's Laboratories, a major pharmaceutical company, is at Pydibhimavaram.

Transport 

Andhra Pradesh State Road Transport Corporation runs bus services to all the major cities and towns of the state from the district.
Major railway stations in the district include Amudalavalasa, Srikakulam Road railway station, Palasa railway station ( major station) Naupada, Ichchapuram and Sompeta etc.

Culture 
The district is renowned for the brassware products namely, Budithi Bell and Brass Craft, which are made at Budithi village. These are registered as geographic indication from Andhra Pradesh.

The district has many people from fields like film industry, music, art and architecture etc. Among the notable people are Vaddadi Papaiah, J. V. Somayajulu, Gidugu Venkata Ramamoorty, Sarat babu, LV Revanth(Indian idol), Rao Ramesh, Rao gopala Rao, Sai kumar, Pingali Nagendrarao, and Kalipatnam Ramarao.

Sports 

Kodi Rammurthy Naidu (body builder), Karnam Malleswari (Olympic medalist), Pujari Sailaja in weight lifting are famous people from the district.

Education 
The primary and secondary school education is imparted by government, aided and private schools, under the School Education Department of the state. As per the school information report for the academic year 2015–16, there are 3,875 schools. They include, 55 government, 2,833 mandal and zilla parishads, 1 residential, 573 private, 14 model, 32 Kasturba Gandhi Balika Vidyalaya (KGBV), 85 municipal and 282 other types of schools. The number of students enrolled in primary, upper primary and high schools of the district is 371,472.

The only university in the district is Dr. B.R. Ambedkar University, Srikakulam and medical colleges are Rajiv Gandhi Institute of Medical Sciences in Srikakulam town, GEMS—Great Eastern Medical Speciality and Hospital in Ragolu village.

Temples 
There are seven temples under the management of Endowments Department.

Important Commodities Produced / Manufactured in the District
Following are the towns & villages with respective commodities produced across the district.

Notable people 

 Sarath Babu, actor
 Gouthu Latchanna, freedom fighter and politician
 Karnam Malleswari, Indian weightlifter
 Kinjarapu Yerran Naidu, Member of Parliament and Central Minister
 Kodi Rammurthy Naidu, Indian bodybuilder
 Grandhi Mallikarjuna Rao, Industrialist
 T. Trivikrama Rao, producer

References

External links 

 Website of Srikakulam District Collectorate
 Official website

 
Districts of Andhra Pradesh
Uttarandhra
1950 establishments in India
Mandal headquarters in Srikakulam district